Antiques Info was a bi-monthly antiques publication that focused on auction reports, news, features and articles relating to the antiques' industry, including details of auction sales and fairs, book reviews, and reader valuations and letters. The magazine was founded in 1993 and went into voluntary liquidation late 2014. It had regular bi-monthly columns including news on upcoming auctions and sales. The magazine was part of Antiques Information Services Ltd. It was based in Kent.

It is being relaunched as a free online magazine, with the New Proprietor having absolutely no involvement in the previous 'Antiques Info' magazine. It is due to launch in the first quarter of 2015.

References

Antiques
Bi-monthly magazines published in the United Kingdom
Defunct magazines published in the United Kingdom
Magazines established in 1993
Magazines disestablished in 2014
Mass media in Kent
Visual arts magazines published in the United Kingdom